The statue of Emiliano Zapata in Cholula, Puebla, Mexico, was erected by Gobierno Municipal de San Pedro Cholula in 2014.

See also
 Cultural depictions of Emiliano Zapata

References

External links

 

2014 establishments in Mexico
2014 sculptures
Monuments and memorials in Puebla
Outdoor sculptures in Cholula, Puebla
Sculptures of men in Mexico
Statues in Puebla